Inga disticha is a species of Fabaceae that was described by botanist George Bentham.

References

disticha